Dattaur is a village in Haryana, India.

Dattaur is known as Shri Shri 1008, the so-called sacred place of Baba Sitaram. The village is also known as a Brahmin-dominated village.  Baba Sitaram is worshipped as a deity of Dattaur.

Demographics 
There are about 2,800 voters in Dattaur. The literacy rate of the village is 85%. 

80% of the residents are employed in private and government professions. There is also an emphasis on making residents self-reliant. Loans and necessary facilities are provided to the youth and farmers, through government schemes based on the Punjab National Bank, the only bank in the village.

The main languages in the village are Hindi, Haryanvi, Sanskrit and Punjabi, with most speaking Hindi and Punjabi.

Other information 
Dattaur uses India's dialling code (+91), the Indian rupee, India's domain name extension (.in) and follows Indian Standard Time (IST). The sunrise time varies by 23 minutes from IST.

Transportation 
The nearest railway station to Dattaur is Ismaila Haryana which is 2.7 km away. The following table shows other railway stations and its distance from Marakudi.

Education
 Greenland Public School
 Government Senior Secondary School
 Genius Play School
 Government High School 
 Charan Singh Memorial Convent Secondary School

Infrastructure
A clean and systematic temple complex is built in the village. There is also a bank, Chaupal, dispensary, library, veterinary hospital, water house, Panchayat house, Bhagwan Parshuram Ashram, Gaushala, water treatment plant and government and private school premises. The main attractions are the Hanuman Temple, Bhagwan Parshuram Temple, Main Shiv Temple, Gaushala, a community centre and a sports complex.

Environmental work 
Children and youth are motivated to tidy up and make important contributions to the village. The villagers are committed to develop Dattaur as a ‘Model Village’.

Places of worship 
 Shree Hanuman Vatika
 Main Shiv Mandir 
 Hanumaan Mandir

Healthcare 
 Baba Sitaram Veterinary Hospital
 Baba Sitaram Primary Health Centre
 Sub health centre 
 Govt Vet Hospital 
 जैन धर्मार्थ औषधालय

Location 
The following map of Dattaur is from Google and Wikimapia. The map shows nearby villages.{
  "type": "FeatureCollection",
  "features": [
    {
      "type": "Feature",
      "properties": {},
      "geometry": {
        "type": "LineString",
        "coordinates": [
          [
            796.75840616226,
            28.817303927634
          ],
          [
            796.75840616226,
            28.817303927634
          ],
          [
            796.76007986069,
            28.81779273633
          ],
          [
            796.76007986069,
            28.81779273633
          ],
          [
            796.76334142685,
            28.81779273633
          ],
          [
            796.76334142685,
            28.81779273633
          ],
          [
            796.76587343216,
            28.815348669908
          ],
          [
            796.76587343216,
            28.815348669908
          ],
          [
            796.76724672318,
            28.812039688598
          ],
          [
            796.76724672318,
            28.812039688598
          ],
          [
            796.76784753799,
            28.811137220907
          ],
          [
            796.76784753799,
            28.811137220907
          ],
          [
            796.76467180252,
            28.81087399969
          ],
          [
            796.76467180252,
            28.81087399969
          ],
          [
            796.76089525223,
            28.810685984129
          ],
          [
            796.76089525223,
            28.810685984129
          ],
          [
            796.75832033157,
            28.812754136642
          ],
          [
            796.75832033157,
            28.812754136642
          ],
          [
            796.7581486702,
            28.817454330554
          ],
          [
            796.75857782364,
            28.817379129121
          ]
        ]
      }
    },
    {
      "type": "Feature",
      "properties": {},
      "geometry": {
        "type": "Point",
        "coordinates": [
          796.76179647446,
          28.814671841374
        ]
      }
    },
    {
      "type": "Feature",
      "properties": {},
      "geometry": {
        "type": "LineString",
        "coordinates": [
          [
            796.7562603950502,
            28.814446230884847
          ],
          [
            796.7562603950502,
            28.814446230884847
          ]
        ]
      }
    }
  ]
}

References

 Wikimedia Maps | Map data © OpenStreetMap contributors. Map data ©2018 Google.

Villages in Rohtak district